Cornelia Lechner (born 13 November 1966) is a German former professional tennis player.

Lechner competed on the professional tennis tour in the 1980s and reached a career best ranking of 190 in the world. She made her debut in a Virginia Slims main draw while touring Japan in 1983, featuring in both the Borden Classic and Japan Open. On the ITF circuit, she won a singles title at Rheda-Wiedenbrück in 1986 and two doubles titles.

ITF finals

Singles: 3 (1–2)

Doubles: 2 (2–0)

References

External links
 
 

1966 births
Living people
German female tennis players
West German female tennis players